The  Georgia Force season was the ninth season for the franchise in the Arena Football League. The team was coached by Dean Cokinos and played their home games at Arena at Gwinnett Center. The Force qualified for the playoffs after finishing the regular season with a 9–9 record, but lost in the conference semifinals to the Jacksonville Sharks. Jacksonville kicked a game-winning field goal as time expired to win the game 58–56. Following this season, it was announced that the Force had folded.

Final roster

Standings

Schedule

Regular season
The Force began the season at home against the Cleveland Gladiators on March 12. They visited the New Orleans VooDoo in their final regular season game on July 21.

Playoffs

References

Georgia Force
Georgia Force seasons
Georgia Force